Karukachal is a town in Changanassery Taluk in Kottayam district of Kerala state in India. The name "Karukachal" was coined from the words "Karuka"(Karukapullu in Malayalam) which is a type of grass which grew in plenty and "chal" meaning a small body of flowing water. Karukachal in Changanacherry-Vazhoor Road which is almost a century old.

Schools and Colleges
NSS Higher Secondary School karukachal
Sarada Vidya Mandiram Champakara
Rajahamsasrama VidhyaPeedom
St Joseph's U.P School Champakara

Hospitals
 Government Hospital (PH Centre)
 NSS Hospital
 Mercy Nursing Home
 Royal Med Care Centre

Religion
Hindus and Christians constitute majority of the population with a minority of Muslims.

Places of Worship
There are a number of temples in Karukachal. Nethalloor Devi Temple in Kottayam Road, Sree Mahadeva Temple, Vettikavumkal Junction and Ayyappa Temple in Central Junction are the main temples in Karukachal.

St. George's Malankara Catholic Church, St. Joseph's church Champakara, St. Mary's Church Koothrappally, Jerusalem Marthoma Church, St. Thomas Marthoma Church in Kottayam Road are the main churches. There is a mosque on Changanacherry road in the center of Karukachal Town.

Banks and Financial Institutions

All the major banks have branches in Karukachal. These include:
 State Bank of India 
Canara BankCSB BankFederal BankUnion Bank of IndiaKerala Gramin BankSouth Indian Bank Axis Bank     etc.There are a number of service co-operative banks as well.

Transportation

Round-the-clock bus services connect Karukachal to Kozhencherry, Changanassery, Erumely, Kottayam, etc. One of the State Highways (SH-09) connecting Kottayam and Pathanamthitta districts from Kanjikuzhy to Kozhencherry pass through Karukachal and is the most frequent bus route.

Notable people 
Kottayam Nazeer (Actor)

References

Villages in Kottayam district